Djurgårdens Idrottsförening, also known simply as Djurgårdens IF, is a Swedish association football club based in Stockholm. The club is affiliated with Stockholms Fotbollförbund, and plays home games at Stockholm Olympic Stadium. The club's first team play in Elitettan as of 2015, the second-tier league in Swedish football, which takes place from April to October every seasons. Djurgården won its first Swedish title 2003 Damallsvenskan, and most recently repeated this in the 2004 Damallsvenskan.

This is a list of seasons played by Djurgårdens IF in Swedish and European football.

Seasons

Key

 P = Played
 W = Games won
 D = Games drawn
 L = Games lost
 F = Goals for
 A = Goals against
 Pts = Points
 Pos = Final position

 Div 1 = Division 1
 Div 2 = Division 2

 F = Final
 Group = Group stage
 QF = Quarter-finals
 QR1 = First Qualifying Round
 QR2 = Second Qualifying Round
 QR3 = Third Qualifying Round
 QR4 = Fourth Qualifying Round
 RInt = Intermediate Round

 R1 = Round 1
 R2 = Round 2
 R3 = Round 3
 R4 = Round 4
 R5 = Round 5
 R6 = Round 6
 SF = Semi-finals

Notes

References

Seasons
 
Djurgarden
Football